In the United States the National Quantum Coordination Office (NQCO) is located in the White House Office of Science and Technology Policy (OSTP). It is legislated by the National Quantum Initiative Act to carry out the daily activities needed for coordinating and supporting the National Quantum Initiative.

Publications
  National Quantum Initiative Supplement To The President's FY 2021 Budget, 01/14/2021
 NQCO Publication Library

External links

Office of Science and Technology Policy in the Federal Register

References

2018 establishments in the United States